Dicrotendipes is a worldwide genus of non-biting midges in the subfamily Chironominae of the bloodworm family Chironomidae.

Species
D. adnilus  Epler, 1987 
D. aethiops (Townes, 1945)
D. botaurus (Townes, 1945)
D. californicus (Johannsen, 1905)
D. ealae (Freeman, 1957)
D. fumidus (Johannsen, 1905)
D. fusconotatus (Kieffer, 1922)
D. leucoscelis (Townes, 1945)
D. lobiger (Kieffer, 1921)
D. lobus Beck, 1962
D. lucifer (Johannsen, 1907)
D. milleri (Townes, 1945)
D. modestus (Say, 1823)
D. neomodestus (Malloch, 1915)
D. nervosus (Stæger, 1839)
D. notatus (Meigen, 1818)
D. pallidicornis (Goetghebuer, 1934)
D. peringueyanus Kieffer, 1924
D. pilosimanus Kieffer, 1914
D. pulsus (Walker, 1856)
D. septemmaculatus (Becker, 1908)
D. simpsoni Epler, 1987
D. sudanicus (Freeman, 1957)
D. thanatogratus Epler, 1987
D. tritomus (Kieffer, 1916)

References

Chironomidae
Nematocera genera